Horace Bénédict de Saussure (17 February 1740 – 22 January 1799) was a Genevan geologist, meteorologist, physicist, mountaineer and Alpine explorer, often called the founder of alpinism and modern meteorology, and considered to be the first person to build a successful solar oven.

Life and work

Horace Bénédict de Saussure was born 17 February 1740, in Conches, near Geneva (today in Switzerland but then an independent republic), and died in Geneva 22 January 1799.

Saussure's family were Genevan patricians. His father, Nicolas de Saussure, was an agriculturist and author. Because his mother was sickly, Saussure was brought up by his mother's sister and her husband the Genevan naturalist Charles Bonnet who sparked Horace-Bénédict's early interest in botany. After attending the "Collège" of his hometown, he completed his studies at the Geneva Academy in 1759 with a dissertation on heat (Dissertatio physica de igne). In 1760, he made the first of numerous trips to Chamonix Valley, at the foot of Mont Blanc, to collect plant specimens for the noted Swiss anatomist, physiologist and botanist Albrecht von Haller. In 1760, Saussure offered a reward to the first man to reach the summit of Mont Blanc. Inspired by his uncle, Charles Bonnet, the young Saussure also did research on the physiology of plants and published Observations sur l'écorce des feuilles et des pétales (1762). The same year, at 22, he was elected professor of philosophy at the Academy of Geneva, where he lectured on physics one year, and on logic and metaphysics the next. He taught there until 1786, occasionally also lecturing on geography, geology, chemistry, and even astronomy.

Saussure's early interest in botanical studies and glaciers  soon led him to undertake other journeys across the Alps. In 1767, he completed his first tour of Mont-Blanc, a trip that did much to reveal the topography of the snowy portions of the Alps of Savoy. He also carried out experiments on heat and cold, on the weight of the atmosphere and on electricity and magnetism. For this, he devised what became one of the first electrometers. Other trips led him to Italy, where he studied Mt. Etna and other volcanoes (1772–73), and to the extinct volcanoes of the Auvergne, in France.

Although a patrician, Saussure held liberal views that induced him to present in 1774 a plan for the development of scientific education in the Geneva College, which would be open to all citizens, but this attempt failed. He was more successful in advocating the creation of the "Société des Arts" (1776), inspired by the London Society for the Improvement of Arts.
 
Beginning in 1774, Saussure sought to reach the summit of Mont-Blanc on the side of Val Veny (now Italy) accompanied by the Courmayeur alpine guide Jean-Laurent Jordaney on the Miage glacier and on Mont Crammont. In 1776 he ascended the Buet (3,096 m). He climbed the Crammont in 1774 and again in 1778, in which year he also explored the Valsorey glacier, near the Great St Bernard. In 1780 he climbed the Roche Michel, above the Mont Cenis Pass. In 1785, he made an unsuccessful attempt on Mont-Blanc by the Aiguille du Goûter route. Two Chamonix men, Michel Paccard and Jacques Balmat, attained the summit in 1786, by way of the Grands Mulets, and in 1787 Saussure himself made the third ascent of the mountain. His achievements did much to attract tourists to places such as Chamonix.

Obsessed by the measurement of meteorological phenomena, Saussure invented and improved many kinds of apparatus, including the magnetometer, the cyanometer for estimating the blueness of the sky, the diaphanometer for judging the clarity of the atmosphere, the anemometer and the mountain eudiometer.  Of particular importance was a hair hygrometer that he devised and used for a series of investigations on atmospheric humidity, evaporation, clouds, fogs and rain (Essais sur l'Hygrométrie, 1783). This instrument sparked a bitter controversy with Jean-André Deluc, who had invented a whalebone hygrometer.

In 1788, Saussure spent 17 days making meteorological observations and physical measurements on the Col du Géant (3,371 m).

In 1789, Saussure climbed the Pizzo Bianco near Macugnaga, to observe the east wall of Monte Rosa, and crossed the Theodulpass (3,322 m) to Zermatt, which he was the first traveler to visit. On that occasion he climbed from the pass up the Klein Matterhorn (3,883 m), while in 1792 he spent three days making observations on the same pass without descending to Zermatt and then visited the Theodulhorn (3,472 m).

All of Saussure's observations and experiments from seven Alpine journeys were summed up and published in four quarto volumes, under the general title of Voyages dans les Alpes (1779 – 1796) (There was an octavo issue in eight volumes, issued from 1780 to 1796). The non-scientific portions of the work were first published in 1834, and often since, as Partie pittoresque des ouvrages de M. de Saussure.

Significance

The Alps were the focus of Saussure's investigations. He saw them as the grand key to the true theory of the earth, and they gave him the opportunity to study geology in a manner never previously attempted. Saussure closely examined the inclination of the strata, the nature of the rocks, the fossils and the minerals.

Saussure had a thorough knowledge of the chemistry of the day and applied it to the study of minerals, water and air. His geological observations made him a firm believer in the Neptunian theory: He regarded all rocks and minerals as deposited from aqueous solution or suspension, and attached much importance to the study of meteorological conditions. His work with rocks, erosion, and fossils also led him to believe that the earth was much older than generally thought and formed part of the basis of Darwin's Theory of Evolution.

Saussure carried barometers and boiling-point thermometers to the summits of the highest mountains, and estimated the relative humidity of the atmosphere at different heights, its temperature, the strength of solar radiation, the composition of air and its transparency. Then, he investigated the temperature of the earth at all depths to which he could drive his thermometer staves, and the course, conditions and temperature of streams, rivers, glaciers and lakes, even of the sea.

Saussure adapted the thermometer to many purposes: for ascertaining the temperature of the air he used one with a fine bulb hung in the shade or whirled by a string, the latter form being converted into an evaporimeter by inserting its bulb into a piece of wet sponge and making it revolve in a circle of known radius, at a known rate; for experiments on the earth and in deep water he employed large thermometers wrapped in non-conducting coatings so as to render them extremely sluggish, and capable of long retaining the temperature once they had attained it.

With these instruments Saussure showed that the bottom water of deep lakes is uniformly cold at all seasons, and that seasonal changes in temperature take six months to penetrate to a depth of 30 ft. in the earth. He recognized the immense advantages to meteorology of high-level observation stations, and whenever it was practicable he arranged for simultaneous observations to be made at different altitudes for as long periods as possible.

Saussure was particularly influential as a geologist, and although his ideas on the underlying principles were often erroneous, he was instrumental in greatly advancing that science. He was an early user of the term "geology"—see the "Discours préliminaire" to volume I of his Voyages, published in 1779—though by no means its inventor as some have claimed, the English word having been used in the 1680s and its Latin counterpart "geologia" during the previous several centuries.

In 1767, Saussure constructed the first known Western solar oven, trying several designs before determining that a well-insulated box with three layers of glass to trap outgoing thermal radiation produced the most heat.

In 1784, Saussure was elected a foreign member of the Royal Swedish Academy of Sciences; in 1788, a foreign member of the Royal Society of London; in 1791, an associate foreign member of l'Académie des sciences de Paris.

Saussure died in 1799 in Geneva.

Recognition
The genus of plants Saussurea, some adapted to growing in extreme high-alpine climates, is named after him and his plant-physiologist son Nicolas-Théodore de Saussure. The Alpine Botanical Garden Saussurea, located at Pavillon du Mont Fréty, first station for the Skyway Monte Bianco cable car, in Courmayeur, Aosta Valley, is named after it.

His work as a mineralogist was also recognized. Saussurite is named after him.  The lunar crater Saussure is also named after him.

Saussure was honoured by being depicted on the 20 Swiss franc banknote of the sixth issue of Swiss National Bank notes (1979 to 1995, when replaced by the eighth issue; the notes were recalled in 2000 and will become valueless on 1 May 2020).

Saussure's son Nicolas-Théodore de Saussure was a noted specialist in plant chemistry and an early pioneer in photosynthesis research.

His daughter Albertine Necker de Saussure was a pioneer in the education of women.

His great-grandson Ferdinand de Saussure was an important linguist and semiotician.

Trivia
In his On the Fourfold Root of the Principle of Sufficient Reason, whilst discussing how reason affects our perception of distance, Arthur Schopenhauer includes an anecdote that Saussure, "when on the Mont Blanc,... saw so enormous a moon rise, that, not recognizing what it was, he fainted with terror".

Notes

References
 Lives by J Senebier (Geneva, 1801), by Cuvier in the Biographie universelle, and by A. P. de Candolle in Décade philosophique
 
 articles by E. Naville in the Bibliothèque universelle (March, April, May 1883)
 chaps. v.-viii. of Ch. Durier's Le Mont-Blanc (Paris, various editions between 1877 and 1897).
 
 René Sigrist, Le capteur solaire de Horace-Bénédict de Saussure. Genèse d'une science empirique. Geneva, Passé-Présent / Jullien, 1993.
 Albert V. Carozzi & Gerda Bouvier, The scientific library of Horace-Bénédict de Saussure (1797): annotated catalog of an 18th-century bibliographic and historic treasure, Geneva, 1994 (Mémoires de la SPHN, t. 46).
 René Sigrist (ed.), H.-B. de Saussure (1740–1799): un regard sur la terre. Geneva, Georg, 2001.

External links

 Pictures and texts of "Les Voyages dans les Alpes" by H. B. de Saussure can be found in the database VIATIMAGES.
 Horace-Benedict de Saussure and his Hot Boxes of the 1700s
 Horace-Bénédict de Saussure works available online 
(1796–1808) Voyages dans les Alpes, précédés d'un essai sur l'histoire naturelle des environs le Genève, 4 vol. – Linda Hall Library
 (1796) "Agenda, Ou tableau général des observations et des recherches dont les résultats doivent servir de base à la théorie de la terre." Journal des mines, no. 20. Paris, an. 4 (1796); p. 1–70. – Linda Hall Library

1740 births
1799 deaths
18th-century botanists from the Republic of Geneva
physicists from the Republic of Geneva
mountain climbers
18th-century physicists
18th-century Protestants
Botanists with author abbreviations
Fellows of the Royal Society
Members of the Royal Swedish Academy of Sciences
18th-century naturalists
Scientific instrument makers
Horace Benedict